Scott McLean may refer to:

 Scott McLean (American football) (born 1960), linebacker (Dallas Cowboys)
 Scott McLean (footballer, born 1976), Scottish footballer (St. Johnstone, Inverness CT, Partick Thistle)
 Scott McLean (footballer, born 1997), Scottish footballer (Kilmarnock FC)
 Scott McLean (rugby league) (born 1981), Australian rugby league player